The Island of Príncipe Biosphere Reserve (established 2012) is a UNESCO Biosphere Reserve in São Tomé and Príncipe.  It encompasses the entire emerged area of the island of Príncipe, its islets Bom Bom, Boné do Jóquei, Mosteiros,  and Pedra da Galé, and the Tinhosas islands (Tinhosa Grande and Tinhosa Pequena) as well as surrounding marine habitats.  The reserve is located in the Gulf of Guinea off the west coast of Africa, and is managed by the regional government of Príncipe.

 Core area:  [marine ; land ]
 Buffer zone:  [marine ; land ]
 Transition area:  [marine ; land ]

Ecological characteristics 

The island is characterized by its gentle relief in the northern half of the island and a mountain range in the southern half composed of several phonolitic peaks with altitudes between  where there is a patch of primary rainforest. The difference in geomorphology and terrain between the two sides, results in differentiated bioclimatology, has influence in the distribution of major types of ecosystems of the island, such as lotic (river) systems in the area of the massif and its valleys and lentic (lake) systems in the northern plains area.

The biosphere reserve is home to great biodiversity in terrestrial as well as in marine ecosystems, with high rates of endemism in many groups of organisms, especially vascular plants, molluscs, insects, birds, reptiles and bats. It is part of the biodiversity hotspot of tropical forests of West Africa, containing a wide range of plant communities and habitats of high international importance such as primary tropical forests, forest shade, palm trees and lowland riparian habitats.

Considering the importance that this area has for the reproduction of sea turtles, seabirds and cetaceans, as well as coral reefs, on the international scene, it is an area of great interest for the conservation of global biological diversity.

Socio-economic characteristics 

, the resident population in the reserve was 6.737 inhabitants, all of whom live in the transition zone as all the islets are uninhabited.

The economic activities in the biosphere reserve are essentially fishing and agriculture (especially cocoa, coffee and copra) besides a small tourist development, mainly composed of some tourism in the capital of Santo Antonio and an island resort in the area of Bom Bom. Agriculture and fisheries are mainly subsistence activities, particularly for consumption and trade surpluses in the local market. Agricultural and fish products are mainly consumed in their primary form, but there are some processed products such as dried fish, fried bananas, the “cacharamba” (local sugar cane rum) and palm wine.

Sources

References

Biosphere reserves
Príncipe
2012 establishments in São Tomé and Príncipe